The 2011–12 season will be MTK Budapest FC's 5th competitive season, 1st consecutive season in the OTP Bank Liga and 123rd year in existence as a football club.

First team squad

Transfers

Summer

In:

Out:

Winter

In:

Out:

Competitions

Overview

Nemzeti Bajnokság II

League table

Results summary

Results by round

Matches

Hungarian Cup

League Cup

Group stage

Quarter-final

Appearances and goals 
Last updated on 3 June 2012.

|-
|colspan="14"|Youth players:

|-
|colspan="14"|Out to loan:

|-
|colspan="14"|Players no longer at the club:

|}

Top scorers
Includes all competitive matches. The list is sorted by shirt number when total goals are equal.
Last updated on 3 June 2012

Disciplinary record
Includes all competitive matches. Players with 1 card or more included only.

Last updated on 3 June 2012

Clean sheets
Last updated on 3 June 2012

References

External links
 Eufo
 Official Website
 fixtures and results

MTK Budapest FC seasons
Mtk Budapest